Cadorago is a comune (municipality) in the Province of Como in the Italian region Lombardy, located about  northwest of Milan and about  southwest of Como.

Cadorago borders the following municipalities: Bregnano, Fino Mornasco, Guanzate, Lomazzo, Vertemate con Minoprio.

References

External links
 Official website

Cities and towns in Lombardy